Osmoxylon is a genus of flowering plants in the family Araliaceae.

Species
The genus has 60 species, which include:

Osmoxylon arrhenicum
Osmoxylon articulatum
Osmoxylon barbatum
Osmoxylon boerlagei
Osmoxylon borneense
Osmoxylon camiguinense
Osmoxylon catanduanense
Osmoxylon caudatum
Osmoxylon celebicum
Osmoxylon chrysanthum
Osmoxylon confertiflorum
Osmoxylon corneri
Osmoxylon dinagatense
Osmoxylon ellipsoideum
Osmoxylon eminens
Osmoxylon fenicis
Osmoxylon geelvinkianum
Osmoxylon globulare
Osmoxylon heterophyllum
Osmoxylon humile
Osmoxylon insidiator
Osmoxylon insigne
Osmoxylon kostermansii
Osmoxylon lanceolatum
Osmoxylon lineare
Osmoxylon luzoniense
Osmoxylon mariannense
Osmoxylon masarangense
Osmoxylon micranthum
Osmoxylon miquelii
Osmoxylon novoguineense
Osmoxylon oblongifolium
Osmoxylon oliveri
Osmoxylon orientale
Osmoxylon pachyphyllum
Osmoxylon palmatum
Osmoxylon pectinatum
Osmoxylon pfeilii
Osmoxylon pseudofoliatum
Osmoxylon pulcherrimum
Osmoxylon puniceopolleniferum
Osmoxylon ramosii
Osmoxylon reburrum
Osmoxylon rectibrachiatum
Osmoxylon russellense
Osmoxylon serratifolium
Osmoxylon sessiliflorum
Osmoxylon simplicifolium
Osmoxylon soelaense
Osmoxylon spathipedunculatum
Osmoxylon striatifructum
Osmoxylon superantiflorum
Osmoxylon talaudense
Osmoxylon tetrandrum
Osmoxylon teysmannii
Osmoxylon trilobatum
Osmoxylon truncatum
Osmoxylon umbelliferum
Osmoxylon whitmorei
Osmoxylon yatesii

References

 
Apiales genera